The 2010–11 DFB-Pokal season came to a close on 21 May 2011 when Duisburg played against Schalke 04 at the Olympiastadion in Berlin. For the first time since 2004, a team from the 2. Bundesliga reached the final.

Schalke 04 won the cup for the fifth time after defeating Duisburg 5–0.

Route to the final
The DFB-Pokal began with 64 teams in a single-elimination knockout cup competition. There were a total of five rounds leading up to the final. Teams were drawn against each other, and the winner after 90 minutes would advance. If still tied, 30 minutes of extra time was played. If the score was still level, a penalty shoot-out was used to determine the winner.

Note: In all results below, the score of the finalist is given first (H: home; A: away).

Match

Summary
The game started off with both teams neutralizing each other in the midfield area. Schalke had a little edge but could no create any chances for themselves. A few quick passes from the frontline of Schalke confused the defense from Duisburg after 18 minutes and Julian Draxler broke through between two defenders and made the opening goal from 20 metres. Schalke had then control over the game and as Jefferson Farfán made a run on the right side Klaas-Jan Huntelaar was ready for the cross to score the 2–0 just four minutes later. Schalke had a few other chances to raise the lead but after 30 minutes Duisburg got better into the game, and had some chances. The biggest one had Sefa Yılmaz after he had an open lane to the goal but somehow waited too long and the defence recovered and his shot went wide right. Later, Manuel Schäffler had a chance when he had his back to the goal with Christoph Metzelder on his back but his shot had not enough power to go past Manuel Neuer's goal. Schalke was struggling but Benedikt Höwedes scored the third goal two minutes before halftime after a corner kick where David Yelldell misread the ball and was too late. After the half-time, the game was decided when José Manuel Jurado scored the 4–0 after a nice pass from Huntelaar with more than 30 minutes to go. After that goal Schalke 04 controlled the pace of the game and Huntelaar scored his second goal after Ivica Banović from Duisburg passes to Goran Šukalo who lost the ball and Huntelaar scored from 10 metres after 70 minutes. Not much chances afterwards and the game ended in a comfortable 5–0 for Schalke 04 for their fifth title.

Details

References

External links
 
 Match report at kicker.de 
 Match report at WorldFootball.net
 Match report at Fussballdaten.de 

2011
2010–11 in German football cups
MSV Duisburg matches
FC Schalke 04 matches
Football competitions in Berlin
2011 in Berlin
May 2011 sports events in Europe